Kongad-II is a village in the Palakkad district, state of Kerala, India. Along with Kongad-I, it is administered by the Kongad gram panchayat.

Demographics
 India census, Kongad-II had a population of 14,406 with 6,880 males and 7,526 females.

References

Kongad-II